François Digard (23 October 1948 – 30 July 2017) was a French politician who served as mayor of Saint-Lô between 1995 and 2014.

References

1948 births
2017 deaths
People from Manche
Mayors of places in Normandy
Union for a Popular Movement politicians
The Republicans (France) politicians
Officiers of the Légion d'honneur